Apostasy is a Swedish black metal band formed in 2000.

History
The original lineup from 2000 (the band should not be confused with the earlier Norwegian band of the same name) consisted of Håkan Björklund and Mathias Edin of Kramfors, Sweden. They recruited Mattias' brother Fredric Edin on vocals and bass, and Lars Engström on guitar. The band name at this time was Marchosias, taken from the demon with the same name.

In January 2002 the band recorded their first demo, simply titled Demo 2002, in Studio Underground in Västerås, Sweden. The two songs on this demo remained as demo material and are considered to be of the "Marchosias" time. One of the songs, "Demons of The Night", would also end up on the compilation CD for Smack Rock Festival 2002, a small festival held in Sundsvall for a few years before being cancelled.

Later in the year of 2002, Andreas Edin (bass) and Dennis Bobzien (keyboards) joined the band, shortly after the departure of Engström. As a replacement for Lars the band found Henrik Johansson. The now six-piece band continued evolving their music style to another level bringing keyboards into the picture. In November 2002 the band recorded another demo with three songs, "Infernal Majesty", "Beneath The Lies of Prophecy" and "The Beauty of Death", which would later appear on the first full-length album by the band. In the late winter/early spring of 2003 the band received an offer for a record deal from Black Mark Records. Shortly before recording their first album, Andreas Edin left the band and was replaced by Leif Högberg. The band's debut Cell 666 was recorded summer 2003. It was also during this recording that the name of the band was changed to Apostasy.

During the two years leading up to the second album release the band had a lot of band members coming and going. In the fall of 2003 Håkan Björklund was asked to leave the band, Dennis Bobzien took over on the drums and Leif Högberg moved over to keyboards and the band recruited former Divine Souls bass player, now in Setherial, Daniel Lindgren. In 2004 Dennis Bobzien decided to quit the band which left the band without a drummer, but they would recruit Peter Sandin who would play drums up until the recording of Devilution where drumming duties were taken care of by Richard Holmgren, who never became a current member of the band. Peter Sandin was not a member of the band past this point. Eventually Daniel Lindgren also left the band to focus on Setherial and Johan Edlund joined the band on bass.

In 2005, Apostasy released their second album, Devilution. On 9 March 2006, guitarist Henrik Johansson died after receiving a stab wound to his heart from his 19-year-old girlfriend at their Kramfors apartment.
 The band eventually recruited Ludvig Johansson and David Ekevärn, and with Johan Edlund leaving the band, Patrik joined in on bass.

In 2009 it was reported that the band were recording their third album, which Frederic Edin stated would be "the most brutal and most technical we have ever made".

In 2010 Thomas Ohlsson (Project Hate) took over the duty of playing drums and with Ludvig Johansson leaving to explore other styles of music, Peter Huss (Shining) joined on guitar.  Later that year, Apostasy signed with record label Rambo Music of Sweden.

Their third album Nuclear Messiah was due for release on 27 April 2011, though the official release was later changed to 24 August 2011.

The song "Sulphur Injection" has appeared in the video game, Brütal Legend.

Band lineup
Current
Fredric Edin (vocals)
Mathias Edin (guitar)
Thomas Ohlsson (drums)
Leif Högberg (keyboards)
 Mikael Björklund (guitar)
 Pontus Lundgren (bass)
Previous members
Peter Huss (guitar)
Patrik Wall (bass)
Ludvig Johansson (guitar)
David Ekevärn (drums)
Daniel Lindgren (bass)
Andreas Edin (bass)
Håkan Börklund (drums)
Richard Holmgren (drums)
Peter Sandin (drums)
Dennis Bobzien (keyboards)
Lars Engström (guitar)
Henrik Johansson (guitar)

Discography
Demo 2002 (Demo, 2002)
MarchosiaS (Demo, 2002)
Cell 666 (Black Mark Production, 2004)
Devilution (Black Mark, 2005)
Nuclear Messiah (2011)(7.1/10)

References

External links
 Apostasy on MySpace
 Black Mark Production
 Rambo Music
 Apostasy on YouTube

Swedish black metal musical groups
Musical groups established in 2000